The Victoria state soccer team is a representative side of Australian state Victoria. The team regularly played against New South Wales and other state teams from 1883.

Throughout the 19th century, Victoria played their state representative matches only against New South Wales, then moved to playing against the rest of the state representative teams later in the early 1900s. Their first representative match against a club, was against Maccabi Tel Aviv in June 1939. The representative side continued to play many of their games against club opponents across the globe after the 1930s.

History

1880s and 1890s
Victoria played their first representative match against New South Wales on 16 August 1883 in a 2–2 draw at the East Melbourne Cricket Ground. Two days later, they played their second match which resulted in a 0–0 draw. Victoria won their first match (4–0 against New South Wales) on 16 July 1885.

Results by opponent

References

External links
 Miscellaneous Games Archive at OzFootball.net

1883 establishments in Australia
Soccer in Victoria (Australia)